The Leubnitzbach  is a river of Saxony, Germany. It flows through Leubnitz-Neuostra, a city district of Dresden.

See also
List of rivers of Saxony

Rivers of Saxony
Rivers of Germany